Anita Guerreau-Jalabert (née Jalabert) is a French medievalist born 25 January 1950 in Marseille.

Career 

She obtained her archivist-palaeographer diploma in 1975 with a thesis devoted to Abbo of Fleury, whose Quæstiones grammaticales she edited and commented.

Anita Guerreau-Jalabert is particularly specialist of kinship relations in the Middle Ages. She leads seminars at the École nationale des chartes and the École des hautes études en sciences sociales.

Director of the École nationale des chartes from 2001 to 2006, she wrote numerous article in scientific journals.

She is married to medievalist Alain Guerreau

Publications 
 L'Irak : développement et contradictions, Paris : Le Sycomore, 1978 (with Alain Guerreau).
 édition critique de : Abbon de Fleury, Questions grammaticales (Quaestiones grammaticales), Paris : Les Belles Lettres, 1982.
 Index des motifs narratifs dans les romans arthuriens français en vers (XIIe-XIIIe siècles), Genève : Droz, 1992.
 Codirection de Histoire culturelle de la France. I, Le Moyen Âge, Paris : Le Seuil, 1997.

References

External links 
 List of publications by Anita Guerreau-Jalabert on Persée
 Occident médiéval et pensée analogique : le sens de spiritus et caro by Anita Guerreau-Jalabert
 Publications by Anita Guerreau-Jalabert on Regesta Imperii

20th-century French historians
French women historians
21st-century French historians
École Nationale des Chartes alumni
French medievalists
Women medievalists
Academic staff of the School for Advanced Studies in the Social Sciences
Academic staff of the École Nationale des Chartes
Chevaliers of the Légion d'honneur
Writers from Marseille
1950 births
Living people
21st-century French women writers
20th-century French women writers